Quest for Love is a South African film released in 1988. It is directed by Helena Nogueira and stars Janna Cilliers, Sandra Prinsloo and Wayne Bowman. A journalist finds it difficult to commit herself to both a relationship and revolution. A lesbian love story, it is set against political turmoil in Southern Africa.

External links 
IMDB entry

1988 films
South African LGBT-related films
1988 LGBT-related films